Ian McLeod (born 11 June 1969) is a former professional boxer who fought in the super-featherweight division.

He is a former Commonwealth and IBO super featherweight champion.

References

External links
 

Scottish male boxers
1969 births
Living people
Super-featherweight boxers